Armen Zakaryan is an Armenian-born Russian amateur boxer.

Career
Zakaryan won gold at the Russian National Boxing Championship in November 2012. He won a gold medal at the 2013 European Amateur Boxing Championships. 

On January 31, 2015, he became the AIBA Pro Boxing world champion in his weight category by defeating Artem Harutyunyan, in a closely fought game. Zakaryan won five out of the eight rounds.
However, in September 2015, he lost the Championship bout to Artem Harutyunyan, in an even more close game. Harutyunyan was declared the winner by split decision of the judges after 12 rounds of boxing.

In 2016 Artem Zakaryan won a gold medal in the Eindhoven Box Cup 2016 in the Netherlands. In the quarterfinals he won against British Royal Navy boxer Luke Fisher (England) by split decision. The semi-finals he saw a unanimous win over Ben Rees Davies (England). In the final Zakaryan won by KO over Indonesia's Kennedy Pattinama.

References

Further reading

Living people
Year of birth missing (living people)
Russian male boxers
Light-welterweight boxers
Russian people of Armenian descent